Marinus "Mario" Westbroek (born 11 March 1961) is a retired Dutch sprinter. He competed in the 100 m and 4 × 400 m relay at the 1980 Summer Olympics, but failed to reach the finals.

References

1961 births
Living people
Athletes (track and field) at the 1980 Summer Olympics
Dutch male sprinters
Olympic athletes of the Netherlands
Athletes from Rotterdam